Pyramidi is the debut solo studio album by American hip hop artist Radioinactive. It was released on Mush Records in 2001.

Critical reception

Kingsley Marshall of AllMusic gave the album 3 stars out of 5, saying, "The resultant aural complexity amounts to one of the tougher listening experiences to be found in the Mush catalog, but will offer endless joy to those in search of something advanced." Brad Haywood of Pitchfork gave the album a 6.7 out of 10 and commented that "prescience and creativity give way to overkill and lack of execution on this one." He added, "This one might even be worth owning just for its distinctiveness."

Track listing

References

External links
 

2001 debut albums
Radioinactive albums
Mush Records albums